This is a list of notable people associated with the French city of Lyon, Rhône.

(list sorted by surname)

Eric Abidal (born 1979)football player
Pierre-Laurent Aimard (born 1957)pianist
André-Marie Ampère (1775–1836)physicist
Houssem Aouar (born 1998)football player
Sidonius Apollinaris (430–489)
Pierre Autin-Grenier (born 1947)writer
Joanny Augier (1813–1855) – French playwright and journalist, born and died in Lyon
Shlomo Aviner (born 1943)religious Zionist rabbi
Pierre-Simon Ballanche (1776–1847)Christian philosopher
Alphonse Balleydier (1810–1859) – historiographer 
Frederique Bangue – athlete
Raymond Barre – French politician
David Bedok – footballer
Azouz Begag (born 1957)writer and politician
Karim Benzema (born 1987)football player
Jean-Baptiste Bertrand (1823–1887) – painter
Paul Bocuse (1926–2018) – prominent chef (recipient of the "Chef of the Century" award);
Jean-François Bony (1754–1825) – artist
Pierre Bouchet (1752–1794)Hôtel-Dieu Head Surgeon
Marc Burty (1827–1903) – music teacher, composer
Caracalla (186–217)Roman Emperor
Marie Charbonnel (1880–1969) – opera singer
Jean Charton de Millou (1736–1792) – Jesuit
David Charvet (born 1972)actor and singer
Claudius (10 BC–54 AD)Roman Emperor
André Coindre (1787–1826)founder of the order of the Brothers of the Sacred Heart
Daphné Collignon (born 1977)comic book author
Gérard Collomb – politician and former mayor of Lyon;
Clovis Cornillac (born 1967)actor
Pierre Coton (1564–1626)Jesuit confessor to kings Henry IV and Louis XIII
Natalie Dessay – opera singer
Youri Djorkaeff (born 1968)football player
Raymond Domenech (born 1952)football trainer and manager
Hubert Dupont (Born 1980) professional cyclist
Jules Favre (1809–1880)republican statesman
Liane Foly – singer, humorist and actress
Florence Foresti (born 1973)humorist
Marie-France Gaîté (better known as Gribouille) (1941–1968)singer
Tony Garnier (1869–1948)architect and utopian planner
Joseph Gensoul (1797–1858)surgeon
Ludovic Giuly (born 1976)football player
Hector Guimard (1867–1942)Art Nouveau architect
Éric Guirado – film director and writer
Marie de Hennezel (born 1946) – psychologist, psychotherapist and writer
Théodore Herpin (1799–1865) – physician known for his work involving epilepsy
Édouard Herriot (1872–1957)French Prime Minister
Maurice Herzog (1919–2012)mountaineer
Irenaeus (2nd century AD – 202) – Bishop of Lugdunum in Gaul and early Christian martyr
Jean-Michel Jarre (born 1948)musician
Louis Jalabert (1877–1943) – Jesuit archaeologist ans epigrapher
Maurice Jarre (1924–2009)composer
Stephane Javelle (1864–1917)astronomer
Allan Kardec (1804–1869)systematizer of Spiritism
Katsuni – pornographic actress
Jérôme Kerviel – trader
Seyhan Kurt – poet, writer
Louise Labé (also identified as La Belle Cordière) (c. 1520–1566)poet
Alexandre Lacassagne – criminologist
Alexandre Lacazette – football player
Bernard Lacombe (born 1952)football player
Alexandre Lanfant (1726–1792)French Jesuit
Madeleine Lavigne (1912–1945) – French resistance and agent for the Special Operations Executive in World War II 
Marie-Anne Leroudier (1838-1908)embroiderer 
Edmond Locard – pioneer in forensic science
Mathias Loras (1792–1858)first bishop of American colonial Dubuque, Iowa
Louise Janssen (1863–1938), opera singer
Auguste and Louis Lumière – inventors of cinematograph
André Manoukian – musician
Fleury Marius (1896–1972)aviator
Claude Martin (1735–1800)soldier, colonial official, and posthumous founder of La Martiniere College
Jean-Baptiste Maunier – actor
Louis Maynard (1871–1940) – writer and local historian
Pierre Monichon (1925-2006) - inventor of the Harmoneon and professor of historical musicology
André Morellet (1727–1819)economist and writer
Jean Moulin – hero and leader of the French Resistance during the Second World War
Wilfrid Nanou – professional footballer
Émile Ntamack – rugby union player
Olivier Panis (born 1966)Formula One racing driver
Gwendal Peizerat (born 1972)ice dancer
Dominique Perben (born 1945)politician
Abbé Pierre (Henri Antoine Grouès) (1912–2007)founder of the Emmaus Mouvement
Bernard Pivot (born 1935)journalist
Maximine Portaz (pseudonym of Savitri Devi) (1905–1982)esoteric Hitlerist author
Jean-Baptiste Pompallier (1801–1871)bishop
Pierre Puvis de Chavannes (1824–1898)painter
François Rabelais (1494–1553)writer
Juliette Récamier (1777–1849)socialite
Adrien Rougier (1892–1984)organist, composer and conductor
Antoine de Saint-Exupéry (1900–1944)aviation pioneer and writer
Jean-Baptiste Say (1767–1832)economist and businessman
Maurice Scève (c. 1500–c. 1564)poet
Louis Gabriel Suchet – marshal of France, one of Napoleon's greatest generals
Bertrand Tavernier (1941–2021)film director
Sylvie Testud – actress
Jean-Marc Théolleyre (1924–2011) – journalist, 1959 Prix Albert Londres winner
Jean-Yves Thibaudet – pianist
Abbé Terray (1715–1778)controller general of finance under Louis XVI
Jean-Claude Trichet (born 1942)president of Banque de France and European Central Bank
Samuel Umtiti (born 1993) football player
André César Vermare (1869–1949) – sculptor
Charles-Marie Widor (1844–1937)organist, composer and conductor
Frank Rivoire (also known as Danger) (born 1984)electronic musician
Mike Lévy (also known as Gesaffelstein) (born 1985) – electronic musician
Anthoine Hubert (1996–2019) – racing driver

Gallery

See also

List of French people

Lyon
 People from Lyon
People